Put a Little Love in Your Heart is an LP album by Jackie DeShannon, released by Imperial Records under catalog number LP-12442 as a stereo recording in 1969.

Track listing

Production
James Langford, René Hall - arrangements
Bud Dalin - executive producer
Don Landee - engineer
Ivan Nagy - photography
Ron Wolin - art direction, design

1969 albums
Jackie DeShannon albums
Albums arranged by René Hall
Imperial Records albums